Kirill Gorbunov (Russian: Кирилл Антонович Горбунов; 1822 (1815?), Vladikino, Penza Oblast — 8 November 1893, Pushkin) was a Russian portrait painter and lithographer.

Biography 
He was born a serf. After displaying some artistic talent, he was sent to Moscow where, from 1836 to 1840, he studied art in a school operated by Karl Rabus. After graduating, he received a recommendation from Nikolai Gogol that enabled him to attend the Imperial Academy of Arts in St.Petersburg from 1840 to 1846, where he studied under Karl Bryullov.

In 1841  Bryullov, together with Vasily Zhukovsky, succeeded in obtaining Gorbunov's freedom. Upon his graduation from the Academy in 1846, he was granted the rights of a "неклассного художника" (Free Artist), which enabled him to set up his own studio. In 1851, his portrait of Alexei Markov earned him the title of Academician. He would eventually produce portraits of virtually every well-known literary figure in Russia (including a series of lithograph portraits commissioned by Alexander Herzen), as well as Tsars Alexander II and Alexander III. From 1851 to 1888 he was a teacher at the Smolny Institute. He later painted icons and frescoes at the Cathedral of Christ the Saviour and several other churches in St.Petersburg.

His major works may be seen in the Russian Museum and the Tretyakov Gallery.

Selected portraits

References

Further reading 
 Great Soviet Encyclopedia, 2nd edition, Vol.12
 Fyodor Bulgakov, Наши художники, с портретами и снимками с их произведений за годы 1764—1889 (Our Painters, with Portraits and Photographs of Their Works), Vol.1, 1889.
 S. P. Vinogradov, Люди сороковых годов в литографиях К. Горбунова (People from the 40s, Lithographs by Gorbunov), Старые годы. 1909 
 Alexei Sidorov, Рисунок старых русских мастеров (Drawings of the Old Russian Masters). Moscow, 1956.
 S. M. Rozenthal, Кирилл Антонович Горбунов, Русское искусство. Moscow, 1958.
 E. Smirnova, Герцен и художник Кирилл Горбунов (Herzen and the Painter Kirill Gorbunov), А. И. Герцен. Moscow, 1946.

External links 

1822 births
1893 deaths
Portrait painters
19th-century painters from the Russian Empire
Russian male painters
19th-century male artists from the Russian Empire